Howard Janotta (October 19, 1924 – November 22, 2010) was an American professional basketball player. After a collegiate career at Long Island University and then Seton Hall University, Janotta played for the Baltimore Bullets in 9 games during the 1949–50 NBA season.

Born in Hackensack, New Jersey, Janotta grew up in nearby Little Ferry and attended Lodi High School.

From 1993 to 2000, Janotta was actor John Travolta's private airplane pilot.

NBA career statistics

Regular season

References

External links

1924 births
2010 deaths
American men's basketball players
United States Army Air Forces bomber pilots of World War II
Baltimore Bullets (1944–1954) players
Basketball players from New Jersey
Forwards (basketball)

LIU Brooklyn Blackbirds men's basketball players
Lodi High School (New Jersey) alumni
Paterson Crescents players
Sportspeople from Hackensack, New Jersey
People from Little Ferry, New Jersey
Seton Hall Pirates men's basketball players
Undrafted National Basketball Association players
Military personnel from New Jersey